Robert A. Fuhrman (February 23, 1925 – November 21, 2009) was an American engineer responsible for the development of the Polaris Missile and Poseidon missile, as well as President and Chief Operating Officer of Lockheed Corporation.

Fuhrman was elected to the National Academy of Engineering in 1976 "for contributions to the design and development of the Polaris and Poseidon underwater launch ballistic missile systems".

Fuhrman graduated From the University of Michigan College of Engineering with a bachelor's degree in aeronautical engineering in 1945 and a master's degree in fluid mechanics and dynamics from the University of Maryland in 1952.

References 

Lockheed people
People from Detroit
1925 births
2009 deaths
Members of the United States National Academy of Engineering
Weapons scientists and engineers
20th-century American engineers
University of Michigan College of Engineering alumni
American chief operating officers
University System of Maryland alumni